Thitipong Warokorn (born 27 January 1989 in Chonburi) is a Thai motorcycle racer. He races in the Asia Road Race SS600 Championship aboard a Kawasaki ZX-6R.

Career statistics

Grand Prix motorcycle racing

By season

Races by year

Supersport World Championship

Races by year

Superbike World Championship

Races by year

Junior Academy

Current Team Riders:

 Teetawat 'Gai' Khunpoo (400SS1), Racing under the number 95 
 Axel Pedersen (400SP-J), Racing under the number 66 
 Whichairot 'Frame' Kongprom (400SP), Racing under the number 142

Asia Superbike 1000

Races by year
(key) (Races in bold indicate pole position; races in italics indicate fastest lap)

References

External links

1989 births
Living people
Thitipong Warokorn
Moto2 World Championship riders
Supersport World Championship riders
Thitipong Warokorn
Superbike World Championship riders